Dida Drăgan (born in Jugureni, Dâmbovița County, 14 September 1946) is a Romanian female pop star who was famous for rock music in the muzică ușoară easy listening music of the 1980s.

In 1993, the she represented Romania in the preliminary round of the Eurovision Song Contest but having finished in seventh place, she failed to qualify for the finals in Ireland.

References

1946 births
Living people
Eurovision Song Contest entrants of 1993
Eurovision Song Contest entrants for Romania